The 2016 U.S. Open Grand Prix Gold, is the tenth Grand Prix's badminton tournament of the 2016 BWF Grand Prix and Grand Prix Gold. The tournament will be held in Los Angeles, California, United States on 5 – 10 July 2016 and has a total purse of $120,000.

Men's singles

Seeds

  Srikanth Kidambi (withdrew)
  Marc Zwiebler (withdrew)
  Rajiv Ouseph (withdrew)
  Ajay Jayaram (semifinal)
  H. S. Prannoy (third round)
  B. Sai Praneeth (third round)
  Nguyen Tien Minh (withdrew)
  Pablo Abián (quarterfinal)

Finals

Top half

Section 1

Section 2

Section 3

Section 4

Bottom half

Section 5

Section 6

Section 7

Section 8

Women's singles

Seeds

  Kirsty Gilmour (withdrew)
  Michelle Li (semifinal)
  Yui Hashimoto (quarterfinal)
  Kaori Imabeppu (second round)
 Zhang Beiwen (quarterfinal)
 Iris Wang (first round)
 Linda Zetchiri (semifinal)
 Aya Ohori (second round)

Finals

Top half

Section 1

Section 2

Bottom half

Section 3

Section 4

Men's doubles

Seeds

 Mathias Boe / Carsten Mogensen (champion)
 Manu Attri / B. Sumeeth Reddy (quarterfinal)
 Adam Cwalina / Przemyslaw Wacha (semifinal)
 Pranaav Jerry Chopra / Akshay Dewalkar (withdrew)

Finals

Top half

Section 1

Section 2

Bottom half

Section 3

Section 4

Women's doubles

Seeds

 Jwala Gutta / Ashwini Ponnappa (withdrew)
 Eva Lee / Paula Lynn Obanana (semifinal)
 Setyana Mapasa / Gronya Somerville (quarterfinal)
 Shiho Tanaka / Koharu Yonemoto (champion)

Finals

Top half

Section 1

Section 2

Bottom half

Section 3

Section 4

Mixed doubles

Seeds

 Chris Adcock / Gabrielle Adcock (withdrew)
 Robert Mateusiak / Nadiezda Zieba (final)
 Phillip Chew / Jamie Subandhi (quarterfinal)
 Robin Middleton / Leanne Choo (semifinal)

Finals

Top half

Section 1

Section 2

Bottom half

Section 3

Section 4

References

External links 
 Tournament Link

U.S. Open Badminton Championships
U.S. Open Grand Prix Gold
BWF Grand Prix Gold and Grand Prix
U.S. Open Grand Prix Gold
U.S. Open Grand Prix
U.S. Open Grand Prix